The Tractors were  an American country rock band composed of a loosely associated group of musicians headed by guitarist Steve Ripley. The original lineup consisted of Steve Ripley (lead vocals, guitar), Ron Getman (guitar, Dobro, mandolin, tenor vocals), Walt Richmond (keyboards, piano, bass vocals), Casey van Beek (bass guitar, baritone vocals), and Jamie Oldaker (drums). Under the band's original lineup, they signed to Arista Nashville in 1994, releasing their self-titled debut album that year; the album only produced one Top 40 hit on the Billboard country charts. 

Since their foundation, most of the band's original members moved on to separate projects, although they often collaborated with frontman Ripley on The Tractors' more recent recordings. Ripley was the only official member of the group throughout its tenure; he had stated that The Tractors was more of a "state of mind", and the band contained a largely undefined cast of unofficial contributors.

Biography
The Tractors were formed in 1988 by Steve Ripley (January 1, 1950 – January 3, 2019). The original lineup comprised Ripley (guitar, lead vocals), Ron Getman (December 13, 1948 – January 12, 2021; electric guitar and slide guitar), Jamie Oldaker (September 5, 1951 – July 16, 2020; drums), Walt Richmond (bass vocals, keyboards), and Casey Van Beek (bass guitar, baritone vocals). All five members had previously been backing musicians for other notable artists, including Bob Dylan, Eric Clapton, Bonnie Raitt, Linda Ronstadt, Leonard Cohen, Oldaker had also played with Leon Russell, Peter Frampton, and Bob Seger.

By 1990, the group was signed to Arista Nashville, a newly formed record label based in Nashville, Tennessee and a subsidiary of Arista Records. In 1994, they released their self-titled debut album, which produced the single, "Baby Likes to Rock It", and soon became the fastest-selling debut album from a country group to reach platinum status. A Christmas album titled Have Yourself a Tractors Christmas soon followed.

The Tractors were nominated for two Grammy Awards and won the Country Weekly 1995 Golden Pick Award for Favorite New Group.

Their second album, Farmers in a Changing World, was released in 1998. The band's members, except for Ripley, soon departed for other projects, although they and Ripley remained close friends and made cameo appearances on subsequent albums. Ripley released the next Tractors album, Fast Girl, with several other musicians on Audium Entertainment in 2001. After Fast Girl, the Tractors left Audium and formed their own label, Boy Rocking Records. In 2009, the album, Trade Union, was released on the E1 label.

Three of the group's five original members have since died; Steve Ripley died at age 69 after a lengthy battle with cancer on January 3, 2019; Jamie Oldaker died of cancer at age 68 on July 16, 2020; and Ron Getman died at age 71 on January 12, 2021, after a brief undisclosed illness. The two surviving original members – Casey Van Beek and Walt Richmond – continue to be musically active, having formed a group named Casey Van Beek and the Tulsa Groove, and releasing an album titled Heaven Forever as recently as 2020; Getman was a brief contributor to this group before his own death.

Sound
The Tractors achieved their distinctive sound in several ways, most notably from the use of old school 'minimal' recording techniques, and an emphasis on capturing everything in one take. Ripley often constructed guitars and cords for use in the band.

Discography

Albums

Notes
A ^ Have Yourself a Tractors Christmas was re-released in 2002 as Tractors Christmas

Singles

Other charted songs

Music videos

References

External links
Official website

1988 establishments in Oklahoma
2018 disestablishments in Oklahoma
American country rock groups
Country music groups from Oklahoma
Rock music groups from Oklahoma
MNRK Music Group artists
Arista Nashville artists
Musical groups established in 1988
Musical groups disestablished in 2018